Untouchable is the second studio album by American rapper Mac Mall from Vallejo, California. It was released on April 23, 1996 via Relativity Records. Production was handled by Mike Mosley, Khayree, Rick Rock, Ant Banks, Cold 187um, Kevin Gardner, Prodeje, Robert Redwine and Tone Capone. It features guest appearances from Ant Banks, Big Hutch, Do Thangs, Kokane, Ray Luv and Young Lay.

The album peaked at number 35 on the Billboard 200 albums chart and at number 6 on the Top R&B/Hip-Hop Albums chart in the United States. It spawned two singles: "Get Right" and "Let's Get a Telly". Its lead single, "Get Right" with Levitti on backing vocals, made it to number 41 on the Hot Rap Songs chart.

Track listing

Chart history

References

External links 

Untouchable by Mac Mall on iTunes

1996 albums
Mac Mall albums
Relativity Records albums
Albums produced by Prodeje
Albums produced by Ant Banks
Albums produced by Rick Rock
Albums produced by Cold 187um